The 2018 KBS Entertainment Awards presented by Korean Broadcasting System (KBS), took place on December 22, 2018 at KBS New Wing Open Hall in Yeouido-dong, Yeongdeungpo-gu, Seoul. It was hosted by Shin Hyun-joon, Yoon Shi-yoon and AOA's Seolhyun.

Nominations and winners

Presenters

Special performances

References

External links 
  
 

Korean Broadcasting System original programming
KBS Entertainment Awards
2018 television awards
2018 in South Korea